En Directo: Gira 2005 La Coruna is the title of the first live album released by Spanish singer Marta Sanchez.

Recording
The album was recorded during the 2005 tour of the singer in Spain. The album was released on April 11, 2006. A DVD was also included on the release. The track list is a selection of her greatest hits, but only from her albums "Mujer", "Desconocida", "Soy Yo", "Lo Mejor de Marta Sánchez", plus her duet with Andrea Bocelli "Vivo Por Ella", the much praised track "Y Sin Embargo Te Quiero" and three tracks from her Olé Olé days: "Con Solo Una Mirada", "Lili Marlen" and "Soldados del Amor". No tracks from her album "Mi Mundo" were included.

Track listing
(CD/DVD)
 "Desconocida" (Steven M. Deutsch, Christian DeWalden, Carlos Toro Montoro, Mike Shepstone, Steve Singer) – 4:42
 "Sigo Intentando" (Marta Sánchez) – 4:19
 "Vivo por Ella" (Mauro Mengali, Luigi Pancieri, Valerio Zelli) – 5:19
 "Soldados del Amor" (Love Crusaders) (Andres Levin, Nile Rodgers) – 6:11
 "Con Solo una Mirada" - Lilí Marlen (Montesano Gonzalez, Gustavo N. Montesano Gzlz, Hans 
Leip, Norbet Schultze) – 6:39	  
 "Quiero Más de Ti" (Bernd Meimunger, Carlos Toro, Alfans Weindorf) – 3:54
 "Profundo Valor" (Piero Cassano, Claudio Silvestri) – 5:09
 "Sepárate" (Carlos Jean, Eva Manzano, Sánchez) – 3:43
 "No Te Quiero Más" (Marivana Viscuso) – 5:49
 "Tal Vez" (Chris Copperfield, DeWalden, Montoro, Shepstone, Ralph Stemmann) – 3:59
 "Y Sin Embargo Te Quiero" (Rafael DeLeón, Quimtero, Quiroga) – 5:12
 "Los Mejores Años de Nuestra Vida" (I Migliori Anni Della Nostra Vita) (Maurizio Fabrizio, Guido Morra) – 4:36
 "Soy Yo" (Paul Barry, Mark Taylor) – 3:51
 "Desesperada" (Montoro, Austin Roberts, Steve Singer) – 3:57
 "De Mujer a Mujer" (Monotoro) – 4:21
 "Caradura" (Jean, Manzano, Sánchez) – 4:40

Personnel 

Paco Arrojo – chorus
Jorge d'Amico – guitar
Santiago Fernandez – mastering, recording, mixing
Carlos Toro Montoro – adaptation
Marta Sánchez – vocals
Bob Sands – percussion, saxophone
Carlos Toro – adaptation
Jorge Villaescusa – musical direction

References

Marta Sánchez albums
2006 live albums
Live video albums
2006 video albums